In Persian mythology, Zarik (or Zarich) is a Daeva in the service of Ahriman. Etymology of Zarik/Zarich comes from Avestan "zairi-gaona" - green/yellow. Oft-depicted in female form, Zarik is the daeva personification of aging and of poison - she is associated with Soma/Haoma (at first, Zarathustra rejected Haoma, calling it "liquor-piss" in Yasna 48.10 of the Gathas and describing its usage in daeva-worshipping rituals). Zarik's amesha rival counterpart is Ameretat.

Persian mythology
Demons in the ancient Near East
Daevas
Yazatas
Iranian goddesses
Iranian deities